The 1948 Montana Grizzlies football team represented the University of Montana in the 1948 college football season as a member of the Pacific Coast Conference (PCC). The Grizzlies were led by tenth-year head coach Doug Fessenden, played their home games at Dornblaser Field and finished the season with a record of three wins and seven losses (3–7, 0–3 PCC).

Schedule

References

Montana
Montana Grizzlies football seasons
Montana Grizzlies football